The 2018 LSU Tigers baseball team represents Louisiana State University (LSU) during the 2018 NCAA Division I baseball season. The Tigers play their home games at Alex Box Stadium as a member of the Southeastern Conference. They are led by head coach Paul Mainieri, in his 12th season at LSU.

Previous season
In 2017, the Tigers won the SEC's Western Division with a record of 52–20–0, 21–9–0 in conference play. They qualified for the 2017 Southeastern Conference baseball tournament and defeated Arkansas in the final, 4–2. They qualified for the 2017 NCAA Division I baseball tournament as the SEC champion, and were selected as the No. 4 overall national seed. The Tigers were selected as hosts of the Baton Rouge regional, which included Rice, Southeastern Louisiana, and Texas Southern. The Tigers swept through the Regional, defeating Texas Southern, 15–7, Southeastern 11–6, and Rice 5–0 advancing to the Super Regional where they hosted conference rival Mississippi State. After a 4–3 comeback victory in which they trailed 3–0 in the bottom of the eighth inning, LSU beat the Bulldogs 14–4 the following night to advance to their 18th World Series. The Tigers defeated Florida State in their opening game 5–4, but then fell to overall number one seed Oregon State 13–1 placing them on the brink of elimination. The Tigers once again beat Florida State 7–4 to earn the right to face Oregon State once again, needing to win twice. LSU advanced to the finals winning 3–1 then 6–1 eliminating the Beavers. In the championship, LSU faced conference rival Florida. The Tigers lost a close Game 1 4–3 then were defeated 6–1 the following night to finish national runners-up, while the Gators earned their first national championship.

Personnel

Roster

Reference:

Coaching staff

Reference:

Schedule

All rankings from Collegiate Baseball.

Reference:

Record vs. conference opponents

Rankings

References

LSU Tigers
LSU Tigers baseball seasons
LSU Tigers baseball
LSU